The 2011 Danmark Rundt was a men's road bicycle race held from 3 to 7 August 2011. It was the 21st edition of the men's stage race to be held, which was established in 1985. Australian rider Simon Gerrans of Team Sky captured the overall title. This was the 2nd Australian Post Danmark Rundt victory.

Schedule

Teams
16 teams were invited to the 2011 Danmark Rundt: 6 teams from the UCI ProTeams, 6 UCI Professional Continental Teams, 3 UCI Continental Teams along with the Danish national team under the Team Post Danmark name.

Stages

Stage 1
3 August 2011 – Esbjerg to Esbjerg,

Stage 2
4 August 2011 – Grindsted to Aarhus,

Stage 3
5 August 2011 – Aarhus to Vejle,

Stage 4
6 August 2011 – Sorø to Frederiksværk,

Stage 5
6 August 2011 – Helsingør to Helsingør,  individual time trial (ITT)

Stage 6
7 August 2011 – Hillerød to Frederiksberg,

Classification leadership

Final standings

General classification

Points classification

Mountains classification

Young rider classification

Team classification

References

External links

Official site (Danish)

Danmark Rundt
Danmark Rundt
2011 in Danish sport